ARC Theatre & Arts Centre is an organisation working from the ARC Theatre & Arts Centre in Stockton-on-Tees, County Durham. The organisation provides arts-based education and entertainment through partnership with other organisations.

Overview
ARC Theatre & Arts Centre comprises a multi-purpose arts centre embracing cinema, theatre, dance and music. Situated on Dovecot Street, it is built on the site of the Hippodrome Theatre, built in 1905, by William Hope. The centre was built in 1997, at a cost of £6.85m, using funds from the National Lottery; it replaced existing arts facilities including the Dovecot Arts Centre and the Cannon cinema. It was designed by RHWL Arts Team, and won a Civic Trust Award in 2001. Richard Wilson designed the artwork 'Over Easy ' which is integral to the building, consisting of a large circular section of wall which is motorised to rotate and provide a dynamic element to the building's design.

ARC has five floors offering four venues: a 266-seat theatre, a 100-seat studio theatre, the mixed he venue called The Point area accommodating 450 standing and 424 fully seated, and the cinema, seating 137  . It also has exhibition spaces, meeting rooms, a café and two bars. The full height glass façade makes the three-level foyer highly visible during the day and at night.

Opening and reopening
It opened in 1998, but despite early success in terms of activity and audiences, struggled financially and closed in November 2001 due to large deficit built up due to over spends in construction and delays with opening. With the support of Stockton-on-Tees Borough Council and Arts Council England, as well as many individuals, an independent trust was formed in 2002 named Stockton Arts Centre ltd and ARC was bought back from the administrators. It re-opened to the public in September 2003 and has gradually recovered from its initial  organisational and financial problems.

Present activity
In June 2012 and September 2014, ARC hosted the television show Question Time, the BBC's flagship programme of topical debate.
The venue is supported and funded through Arts Council England, Stockton Borough Council and the income it generates. ARC takes part in the Stockton International Riverside Festival and Christmas in Stockton. It also has links with Stockton Riverside College and Durham University to increase student usage.

References

Arts organisations based in the United Kingdom
Recipients of Civic Trust Awards
Buildings and structures in Stockton-on-Tees